Protein tyrosine phosphatase non-receptor type 7 is an enzyme that in humans is encoded by the PTPN7 gene.

Function 

The protein encoded by this gene is a member of the protein tyrosine phosphatase (PTP) family. PTPs are known to be signaling molecules that regulate a variety of cellular processes including cell growth, differentiation, mitotic cycle, and oncogenic transformation. This gene is preferentially expressed in a variety of hematopoietic cells, and is an early response gene in lymphokine stimulated cells. The noncatalytic N-terminus of this PTP can interact with MAP kinases and suppress the MAP kinase activities. This PTP was shown to be involved in the regulation of T cell antigen receptor (TCR) signaling, which was thought to function through dephosphorylating the molecules related to MAP kinase pathway. Two alternatively spliced transcript variants encoding different isoforms have been found for this gene.

Interactions 

PTPN7 has been shown to interact with MAPK3 and MAPK1.

References

Further reading